The Bonita Beach Causeway is a series of four low-level bridges located in Southwest Florida traversing the barrier islands of Estero Bay connecting the town of Fort Myers Beach with Bonita Springs. Each bridge on the Bonita Beach Causeway is named after the body of water it crosses.

Route description
Estero Boulevard (which crosses the causeway) begins just south of the Bonita Beach Causeway on Little Hickory Island, splitting off from Hickory Boulevard (County Road 865). It heads north and crosses Big Hickory Pass Bridge, which lands on Big Hickory Island. After a short distance, it then crosses the New Pass Bridge, and lands on Long Key, and enters the Lovers Key / Carl E. Johnson State Park. After crossing the Little Carlos Pass Bridge onto Black Key, Estero Boulevard turns west and crosses the Big Carlos Pass Bridge, a small single-leaf drawbridge, onto Estero Island, and the town of Fort Myers Beach.

History
Before the causeway's construction, the only way to access Estero Island and Fort Myers Beach by car was via the Matanzas Pass Bridge (which was still a small swing bridge at this time). The swing bridge's machinery was highly unreliable, which concerned islanders who feared the bridge would break down in the event of an emergency, such as a hurricane evacuation. The islanders felt having a second exit for the island for safety reasons would be wise.

The county then decided the most feasible location was to run the causeway from the south end of the island over barrier islands to Bonita Springs.  The causeway's exact routing was selected by surveyor Carl Johnson (for whom Lovers Key / Carl E. Johnson State Park was named), and he became known as the father of the project. Construction began in 1963, and the causeway opened on July 4, 1965.

Gallery

References

Bridges in Lee County, Florida
Causeways in Florida
Bonita Springs, Florida
Road bridges in Florida
Roads in Lee County, Florida
Bridges completed in 1965
Bridges completed in 1979
1965 establishments in Florida
Steel bridges in the United States
Concrete bridges in the United States
Girder bridges in the United States
Bascule bridges in the United States
Transportation buildings and structures in Lee County, Florida